The women's snowboard halfpipe competition at the 2007 Asian Winter Games in Changchun, China was held on the 29th of January at the Beida Lake Skiing Resort.

Schedule
All times are China Standard Time (UTC+08:00)

Results

Qualification run 1

Qualification run 2

Final

References 

Qualification 1
Qualification 2
Final
Final ranking

External links
FIS website

Women